The Fox News Channel (FNC) is an American basic cable and satellite news television channel that was founded by media mogul Rupert Murdoch in 1996.  In 2001 Roger Ailes appointed himself as permanent CEO of this news operation that was created as a Republican-centered alternative to CNN. In January 2002, the ratings of the channel surpassed top-rated CNN to become the No. 1 news cable channel. They fell in March 2002, but since then the network has maintained its No. 1 cable rating (as of 2019) with increasing viewership and international access. 

Fox News' dominant status was challenged in the wake of the 2021 storming of the United States Capitol, with CNN taking the No. 1 network place back for a first time since the 2000s, alongside rival MSNBC in second place, with Fox News in third place. It has since regained the top spot.

1990s

Launch 
The channel was created by Australian-born American media mogul Rupert Murdoch, who hired Roger Ailes as its founding CEO. The channel was launched on October 7, 1996 to 17 million cable subscribers. Prior to founding Fox News, Murdoch had gained significant experience in the 24-hour news business when News Corporation's British Sky Broadcasting subsidiary started Europe's first 24-hour news channel, Sky News, in the United Kingdom in 1989. With the success of his fourth network efforts in the United States, experience gained from Sky News, and turnaround of 20th Century Fox, Murdoch announced on January 31, 1996, that his company would be launching a 24-hour news channel to air on both cable and satellite systems as part of a News Corp. "worldwide platform" for Fox programming, reasoning that "The appetite for news – particularly news that explains to people how it affects them – is expanding enormously."

In February 1996, after former NBC executive and Republican Party political strategist Roger Ailes left America's Talking (now MSNBC), Murdoch called him to start the Fox News Channel. Ailes worked individuals through five months of 14-hour workdays and several weeks of rehearsal shows before launch, on October 7, 1996.

At launch, only 10 million households were able to watch Fox News, with none in the major media markets of New York City and Los Angeles. According to published reports, many media reviewers had to watch the first day's programming at Fox News' studios because it was not readily available. The rolling news coverage during the day consisted of 20-minute single topic shows like Fox on Crime or Fox on Politics surrounded by news headlines. Interviews had various facts at the bottom of the screen about the topic or the guest.

2000s 
In the 2000 presidential election, Fox News, which was available in 56 million homes nationwide, saw a staggering 440% increase in viewers, the biggest gain among the three cable news television networks.

2020s 

Fox News ended 2020 as the most-watched network in cable news history. However, in January 2021, after the U.S. Capitol attack, it was less watched than CNN and MSNBC for three straight days, which had not happened since September 2000.

In August 2021, Fox required compulsory reporting of COVID-19 vaccination status from employees, despite prominent Fox personalities Tucker Carlson and Sean Hannity being opposed to mandatory reporting of COVID-19 vaccination status.

Programming

The Edge 
Hosted by Paula Zahn, The Edge was one of the original programs on the network, focusing on talk between the host and newsmakers, like other programs on the network at the time. During the program's later years, John Gibson became host when the network discovered Zahn was in the midst of contract negotiations with CNN. The show was cancelled in 2002.

The O'Reilly Factor 
On October 7, 1996, The O'Reilly Report aired its first episode, hosted by Bill O'Reilly. It was later renamed because of a suggestion by a friend. The O'Reilly Factor, unlike many other Fox News programs, was pre-recorded, or "live-to-tape," except when covering breaking news or special events. Some guests were interviewed before the "live-to-tape" period and were slotted in the program as appropriate. O'Reilly's producers said that video editing took place only when an interview exceeded the available length in a program, of which the total was 43 minutes (for an hour-long slot, once commercials and news breaks are added), though some critics suggested that interviews were sometimes edited after taping to suit O'Reilly's agenda.

O'Reilly and his producers discussed potential topics twice a week. A producer researched the story and booked guests for O'Reilly, and an information packet was produced with possible angles for O'Reilly to explore. The producers would often "pre-interview" the guest so that they know what potential points he or she might make. For each show, O'Reilly, with the assistance of his staff, produced a script with the words for the "Talking Points Memo" and "Most Ridiculous Item of the Day" segments, and points of discussion and questions for the guests that appeared on the program. On February 2, 2009, the show began airing in high definition and moved to the previous set used by the Fox Report.

The show ended in 2017 after O'Reilly was dismissed from the network due to sexual harassment allegations, leading to a large advertiser boycott of the show.

Your World with Neil Cavuto 
Debuting as the Cavuto Business Report on the network's launch in 1996, Your World with Neil Cavuto has become a very popular show, hosted by reporter and commentator Neil Cavuto. The program covers the latest business news stories of the day, in addition to giving analysis on how the stock market moved through the day. It also covers political stories, such as how political actions may affect the markets, in addition to analysis of the markets by a group of analysts from one of the Cost of Freedom business block programs. Closing the program, the show has a commentary segment called "Common Sense," in which Neil gives his point of view on a news story of the day. The program is broadcast live weekdays at 4 p.m. ET.

Hannity and Colmes 

Hannity & Colmes was an American television show on Fox News Channel, hosted by Sean Hannity and Alan Colmes, who respectively presented a conservative and liberal perspective. The series premiered in October 1996, and the final episode aired on January 9, 2009. It was the precursor to the current Hannity series, which currently airs in the same timeslot.

Fox Magazine 
Fox Magazine was launched in 1997 as a weekly newsmagazine on the Fox News Channel. Hosted by Laurie Dhue, the program was an almost weekly look into some of the previous week's stories, in addition to special series produced by the program itself, such as its constant series about Nashville. These shows mostly consisted of adverts from the Fox News program and the National Rifle Association. Included in the programming were a recap of the previous week's commentaries from a number of the network's commentators. The program would come to an end on September 11, 2005, with Dhue leaving the network to work on Geraldo at Large.

Fox and Friends 
Fox & Friends is a morning news show that debuted in 1998. It is currently hosted by Ainsley Earhardt, Steve Doocy, and Brian Kilmeade during the week.  Weekends are hosted by Rachel Campos-Duffy, Pete Hegseth and Will Cain.

Drudge 
Drudge was a television series on Fox News Channel that was hosted by Matt Drudge. Drudge left the show in 1999 after network executives refused to let him show a National Enquirer photograph of a 21-week-old fetus in protest of abortion.

References 

Fox News
Fox News
Fox News
Fox News
Fox News